Picardo Farm is a  parcel of property in Wedgwood, Seattle, Washington, consisting largely of 281 plots used for gardening allotments. It is the original P-Patch (the local term for such community gardens): the "P" originally stood for "Picardo", after the family who owned it. The Picardos' land went beyond the present P-Patch; it also encompassed the property of the adjacent Reform Jewish Temple Beth Am and of University Prep, an independent private co-educational, non-sectarian day school for grades six through twelve. The land was part of what had once been known as the Ravenna Swamp.

It is one of two historical farms preserved within Seattle city limits, the other being Marra Farm in South Park.
The city's official web site describes Picardo Farm as having "Seattle's best soil… Rich, black, peaty, sucking with moisture in the spring, powdery dry for digging potatoes…

History

Creation

The Picardo family arrived in Seattle in the 1890s from Salza Irpina in the southern Italian province of Avellino. The three brothers—Ernesto (who became the family patriarch), Orazio, and Sabino—resisted the gold rush fever of the Klondike and set up farming in South Park along the Duwamish River.

In 1922 they swapped a house in South Park for a piece of land that had been part of what was known as the "Ravenna Swamp". Architect Victor Steinbrueck, writing in 1962, called it "an unusual reminder of the past" and praised its old barn (now demolished) as "a simple example of the anonymous architecture that has always been part of the local scene." Rainie Picardo leased out plots for a few more years, and then the city bought the land.

Ravenna Swamp
While the peaty soil was a blessing for a farm, it was not so for buildings. Some small houses were built along 25th Avenue just south of Picardo Farm. They were effectively floating on the peat bog. When the city put in sewer lines along 25th Avenue, the situation worsened: the water table sank, and houses began to slide off of their foundations. The city eventually purchased these lots to build the Dahl Playfield. At least one of the houses was moved to a new site.

Venus statue controversy

The soil isn't the only thing that has put Picardo Farm on the map: it's also known for Steve Anderson's 2-foot-high bronze statue known as the Picardo Venus: "Pregnant, naked, hair in dreadlocks and sporting a sparkling nose stud". Sitting next to a children's play area, the statue was originally quite controversial. One P-Patch gardener remarked of it, "She’s glorifying fertility a little too much for kids, isn’t she?" Nonetheless, a January 2000 poll of the Picardo gardeners resulted in a decision to keep the statue.

Amenities
From late 2009 to early 2010 a Clivus Multrum composting toilet system was installed on the NE portion of the farm.

See also

References

External links

 Official site, as part of the Seattle Department of Neighborhoods
 Picardo Farm P-Patch website
 Sculptor Steve Anderson's web site

Community gardening in Washington (state)
Parks in Seattle
Wedgwood, Seattle